Casper may refer to:

People
 Casper (given name)
 Casper (surname)
 Casper (Maya ruler) (422–487?), ruler of the Mayan city of Palenque
 Tok Casper, first known king of Maya city-state Quiriguá in Guatemala, ruling beginning in 426
 David Gray (snooker player) (born 1979), nicknamed Casper
 Casper (rapper) (born 1982), German musician
 DJ Casper (born 1971), American musician

Places in the United States
 Casper, Wyoming, a city
 Casper Mountain, overlooking Casper, Wyoming

Entertainment
 Casper Gutman, the primary antagonist of The Maltese Falcon.
 Casper the Friendly Ghost, a Paramount cartoon character owned by Harvey Comics
 Casper the Friendly Ghost in film, a series of films based on the Harvey Comics character
 Casper (film), a 1995 live-action film featuring Casper the Friendly Ghost
 Casper: A Spirited Beginning, a direct-to-video prequel of the 1995 film
 Casper Meets Wendy, a direct-to-video sequel to Casper: A Spirited Beginning
 Casper's Haunted Christmas, a direct-to-video animated feature set in Christmas Time
 Casper's Scare School, second direct-to-video animated film
 Casper and the Spectrals, a 2009-2010 three issued comic book miniseries that revamped Casper the Friendly Ghost
 Casper (video game), a series of video games based on the 1995 film
 "Casper" (song), by Takeoff
 "The Day That Never Comes", a song by Metallica with the working title "Casper"
 Casper, one of three parts of the biocomputer in the anime series Neon Genesis Evangelion

Science and technology
 Casper (persistency), a file used for persistency in Linux
 Casper, the Apollo Command/Service Module of the Apollo 16 spacecraft

Transportation
 Hyundai Casper, a sport utility vehicle

Other uses
 , a World War II frigate
 Casper (cat) (c. 1997–2010), a cat famous for riding on buses
 CASPer, a medical school admissions test
 Casper College, Casper, Wyoming, US
 Casper (skateboarding), a skateboarding trick
 Casper Sleep, a mattress manufacturer
 Casper's, a hot dog restaurant chain in Northern California
 a line of Swedish boardgames published by Target Games

See also
 Caspar (disambiguation)
 CASPR, a human protein
 Casspir, a South African armored personnel carrier
 Gasper (disambiguation)
 Kasper (disambiguation)